Football Dreams is a novel by the American writer David Guy.

Set in the 1960s, it tells the coming-of-age story of Dan Keith as he negotiates the demands of American football culture at Arnold Academy, a fictional all-boys prep school in suburban Pittsburgh, Pennsylvania. Largely autobiographical, the novel's depiction of life at Arnold Academy thinly veils the author's real-life experiences at his own alma mater, Shady Side Academy, in suburban Fox Chapel.

References

1980 American novels
Novels set in Pittsburgh
American football books
American sports novels
Fiction set in the 1960s